Petr Cigánek (born 3 September 1986) is a Czech former football player.

Cigánek played Gambrinus liga for Baník Ostrava, where he played since the youth teams. He won the Czech Cup with Baník in 2005.

External links
 
 
 Profile at Baník Ostrava website

1986 births
Living people
Czech footballers
Czech Republic youth international footballers
Czech Republic under-21 international footballers
Czech First League players
FC Baník Ostrava players
SFC Opava players
Association football defenders
People from Frýdek-Místek
Sportspeople from the Moravian-Silesian Region